"Blind Before I Stop" is a single by Meat Loaf released in 1987. It is from the album Blind Before I Stop.  It is one of the few songs he has made where he plays rhythm guitar.

Critical reception
On its release, Mat Snow of New Musical Express stated, "This is not a patch on his elephantine 'Rock 'n' Roll Mercenaries', though it might serve as a timely health warning to some of Meat Loaf's more frenzied devotees."

Personnel
Meat Loaf — lead vocals, guitar
Mats Björklynd — keys, programming, drums
Peter Weihe — guitars
Dieter Petereit — bass
John Golden — bass
Pit Löw — keyboards and programming
Curt Cress — drums
Amy Goff — backing vocals
Peter Bischof — vocals
Bert Gebhard — vocals
Bimey Oberreit — vocals
Elaine Goff — vocals

Charts

References

Meat Loaf songs
1987 singles
Song recordings produced by Frank Farian
1987 songs
Arista Records singles